Karneid is a comune (municipality) in South Tyrol in northern Italy, located about  east of the city of Bolzano. It is also the location of Karneid castle.

Geography

Karneid borders the following municipalities: Bolzano, Völs am Schlern, Welschnofen, Deutschnofen, Ritten, and Tiers.

Frazioni
The municipality of Karneid (Cornedo) contains the frazioni (subdivisions, mainly villages and hamlets) Blumau (Prato all'Isarco), Breien (Briè), Kardaun (Cardano), Steinegg (Collepietra), and Gummer (San Valentino in Campo).

History

Coat-of-arms
The emblem is an argent curved pile on azure. It is part of the insignia of the Counts of Liechtenstein, owners of the castle, which ruled the village from 1385 to 1595. The arms were adopted in 1968.

Society

Linguistic distribution
According to the 2011 census, 89.03% of the population speak German, 10.64% Italian and 0.33% Ladin as first language.

Demographic evolution

Culture

Notable people
 The Italian ski mountaineer Hansjörg Lunger was born in Karneid.

References

External links
 Homepage of the municipality

Municipalities of South Tyrol